This is a list of network games on the Xbox video game console. It includes Online Multiplayer titles as well as System link enabled games, which can be played by connecting multiple Xbox systems together locally.

After Microsoft's termination of the original Xbox Live service on April 15, 2010, the majority of the game titles remain virtually playable, but their online connectivity and functionality are rendered defunct, even after some of them were re-released digitally. However, services run by fans, such as Insignia, allow players to continue to play Xbox Live titles online.

Network Features

Basic Features 

Online Multiplayer: Create, join, and spectate matches with other players.

Content Download: Additional updates, maps, missions, modes, or characters are available to download via Xbox Live.

Scoreboards: Measure your performance against other players with global leaderboards.

Friends: View, invite, and manage your list of Xbox Live friends.

Voice: Communicate with other players using in-game voice chat.

System Link: Connect multiple Xbox consoles together to play over a local network connection.

Additional Features 

Clans: Create organised player groups in-game, with a clan tag for easy identification.

Competitions: Join and create tournaments directly through the in-game Xbox Live menu.

Xbox Live Aware: Receive invitations and view Xbox Live friends, even when playing single player modes.

XSN: Xbox Sports Network, a service for Microsoft-developed sports titles that allows for web-based player tournaments and stats.

Released Games

Unreleased games

See also
 List of Xbox games

Xbox network games